Grafschaft is a locality in the municipality Schmallenberg in the High Sauerland District in North Rhine-Westphalia, Germany.

The village has 1097 inhabitants and lies in the east of the municipality of Schmallenberg at a height of around 410 m. The river Grafschaft flows through the village. Grafschaft borders on the villages of Schmallenberg, Gleidorf, Winkhausen, Almert, Störmecke and Latrop. 

In 1072 a Benedictine monastery of Grafschaft was founded in Grafschaft on a site at the foot of the Wilzenberg mountain, by St. Anno II, Archbishop of Cologne.
The village used to belong to the municipality of Grafschaft in Amt Schmallenberg until the end of 1974.

Gallery

External links 
Grafschaft

References

Villages in North Rhine-Westphalia
Schmallenberg